"When I'm with You" is the third single from Faber Drive's debut album Seven Second Surgery. The song peaked at number 19 on the Canadian Hot 100 chart. The song is about a couple in which the guy spends a long time away from his girlfriend and his promise to stay with her and spend more time with her. The music video was filmed in a hospital and premiered on February 20, 2008 on MuchMusic's MuchOnDemand.

Music video
The music video describes a young woman who lost her boyfriend in a car accident. The video starts off with doctors rushing in with the patient who appears to be the injured boyfriend. A series of clips show the band singing and the desperate doctors trying multiple methods of saving the young man but failing. Meanwhile, the young woman tries to approach other people at the hospital, presumably to ask where her boyfriend is, but they don't respond. The video ends with her discovering her own body in the hospital and realizing that she is in fact the one who died. Shortly afterward, the young man's heartbeat flatlines, and doctors try to revive him but fail. The girlfriend takes his hand in her own and brings him back to life. The young woman walks outdoors into white light and into the afterlife.

Chart performance
The song debuted at number 88 on the week of February 2, 2008. It hit the Top 40 on the week of March 15, 2008 reaching number 27. It reached number 19 on the week of April 16, 2008 and left the chart four weeks later, spending a total of twenty weeks on the chart.

Charts

Weekly charts

Year-end charts

Certification

References

2008 singles
Faber Drive songs
Canadian pop punk songs
Songs written by Brian Howes
2007 songs
Rock ballads
Universal Records singles